Sándor Káli (born July 3, 1951) is a Hungarian politician and Member of Parliament. Káli is a member of the Hungarian Socialist Party and a former mayor of Miskolc from October 20, 2002 to October 3, 2010.

External links
 Sándor Káli House of the Nation register
 Biography

1951 births
Living people
Politicians from Budapest
Mayors of places in Hungary
Hungarian Socialist Party politicians
Hungarian Roman Catholics
Members of the National Assembly of Hungary (2002–2006)
Members of the National Assembly of Hungary (2006–2010)
Members of the National Assembly of Hungary (2010–2014)